is a passenger railway station in the city of Kimitsu, Chiba Prefecture, Japan, operated by the East Japan Railway Company (JR East).

Lines
Obitsu Station is a station on the Kururi Line, and is located 18.2 km from the terminus of the line at Kisarazu Station.

Station layout
The station consists of a single side platform serving bidirectional traffic. The station formerly had dual opposed side platforms, but one platform is no longer in use, although its overgrown ruins can still be seen to one side of the station. The platform is short, and can only handle trains with a length of four carriages or less. The station is unattended.

Platform

History
Obitsu Station was opened on December 28, 1912 as a station on the Chiba Prefectural Railways Kururi Line. The line was nationalized into the Japanese Government Railways (JGR) on September 1, 1923. The JGR became the Japan National Railways (JNR) after World War II. The station was absorbed into the JR East network upon the privatization of the JNR on April 1, 1987.

Passenger statistics
In fiscal 2006, the station was used by an average of 154 passengers daily.

Surrounding area

 
 Obitsu Middle School
 Obitsu Elementary School
 Obitsu Public Hall

See also
 List of railway stations in Japan

References

External links

  JR East Station information  

Kururi Line
Stations of East Japan Railway Company
Railway stations in Chiba Prefecture
Railway stations in Japan opened in 1912
Kimitsu